Candelabra tree can refer to:

 Araucaria angustifolia, native to Brazil
 Several species of Euphorbia, including:
 Euphorbia ammak, native to Arabia and Yemen
 Euphorbia candelabrum, native to eastern Africa
 Euphorbia cooperi, Transvaal candelabra tree
 Euphorbia halipedicola, native to eastern Africa
 Euphorbia ingens, native to southern Africa
 Euphorbia lactea, native to tropical Asia
Senna didymobotrya, native to Africa
Various large individual Sequoiadendron giganteum trees, including one at Packsaddle Grove, California